Agrani Bank Cricket Club is a cricket team in Bangladesh. They were one of the twelve teams that took part in the 2017–18 Dhaka Premier Division Cricket League tournament. They were relegated after one season, but returned to the league for the 2022–23 competition.

History
The club is owned by Agrani Bank, one of the largest banks in Bangladesh. It is one of the oldest existing cricket clubs in Bangladesh, having competed in domestic cricket since the first competitions in 1972–73. They were promoted to the Dhaka Premier Division for 2017–18 after finishing first in Group A of the Dhaka First Division Cricket League in 2016–17.

In their first List A match, in the first round of the 2017–18 tournament, they beat the defending champions Gazi Group Cricketers by 8 wickets. However, they finished the group stage of the 2017–18 tournament in eleventh place, therefore qualifying for the relegation playoffs. In the final match of the relegation playoffs, they lost to Brothers Union by four wickets, therefore relegating them to the Dhaka First Division Cricket League for the next season.

Agrani Bank returned to the Dhaka Premier Division Cricket League for the 2022–23 competition.

References

External links
 Agrani Bank Cricket Club at ESPN Cricinfo

Dhaka Premier Division Cricket League teams